Kwani? (Sheng for so what?) is a leading African literary magazine based in Kenya that has been called "undoubtedly the most influential journal to have emerged from sub-Saharan Africa". 

The magazine grew out of a series of conversations that took place among a group of Nairobi-based writers in the early 2000s. Its founding editor, Binyavanga Wainaina, spearheaded the project shortly after winning the 2002  Caine Prize for African Writing. The first print issue of the magazine was published in 2003.   

Kwani? is produced by the Kwani Trust, which is "dedicated to nurturing and developing Kenya’s and Africa’s intellectual, creative and imagination resources through strategic literary interventions". The organisation receives significant funding from the Ford Foundation.

The magazine has become a major platform for writing from across the African continent, and has served as a launching pad for the careers of several writers, including Yvonne Adhiambo Owuor, winner of the 2003 Caine Prize; Uwem Akpan, author of the bestselling short-story collection Say You're One of Them, and Billy Kahora, now the magazine's managing editor. Each edition of the journal contains up to 500 or more pages of new journalism, fiction, experimental writing, poetry, cartoons, photographs, ideas, literary travel writing and creative non-fiction. 

Each volume of Kwani? is organized around a theme. For example, the seventh edition, subtitled "Majuu" (a Sheng (Nairobi street slang) word meaning "overseas"), was "a 570-page testament to the journal's diasporic roots".

History

Kwani Trust
Kwani Trust is a regional literary hub and a community of writers that is committed to the growth of the region's creative industry through publishing and distributing contemporary African literature, offering training opportunities, producing literary events and establishing global literary networks. The Kwani? Literary Festival is organized on a biennial basis, where for the course of one week, the literary leaders of Kenya, enriched with visiting writers from around the world explore issues through the lenses of the continent’s past, present and emerging literatures.

Kwani? Manuscript Project
In 2012, the Kwani? Manuscript Project was launched, a one-off literary prize for unpublished fiction manuscripts from African writers across the continent and in the African diaspora, with a judging panel comprising Jamal Mahjoub, Ellah Allfrey (deputy editor of Granta magazine), Helon Habila, Simon Gikandi, Mbugua wa Mungai (chairman of Kenyatta University's Literature Department) and Irene Staunton (of Weaver Press in Zimbabwe). The longlist was published on 12 April 2013, and in July 2013 the winner was announced as Ugandan writer Jennifer Nansubuga Makumbi, the runner-up being Liberia's Saah Millimono for One Day I Will Write About This War and third place going to Kenya's Timothy Kiprop Kimutai for The Water Spirits.

References

External links
Kwani? website
artmatters.info - a critical review
Stephen Derwent Partington, "War on Kwani? marks the death of literary engagement and rise of spite", Daily Nation, 9 February 2013.

2003 establishments in Kenya
Literary magazines
Magazines established in 2003
Magazines published in Africa
Mass media in Kenya
Mass media in Nairobi